Abacetus johannae is a species of ground beetle in the subfamily Pterostichinae. It was described by Straneo in 1961.

References

johannae
Beetles described in 1961